Diman may refer to:
 Diman, Iran
 Diman, Nepal
 Deman, Azerbaijan
 Dimane, Lebanon